The 2009 Belmont Stakes was the 141st running of the Belmont Stakes. The race took place on June 6, 2009, and was televised on ABC and ESPN360. The value of the race was $1,000,000 in stakes. Post time was 6:19 p.m. EST. As the final jewel in the Triple Crown, this year's event was run without the elusive championship at stake as 2009 Kentucky Derby winner Mine That Bird was defeated in the Preakness. The attendance at Belmont Park was 52,861.

Summer Bird closed stoutly in the stretch and was victorious over Dunkirk and Mine That Bird, who battled on for the minor placings.

Pre-race announcements
After winning the Preakness, connections of winner Rachel Alexandra were not committed to the race.
With a week before the race they decided not to enter the filly.

Among the possible challengers to Mine That Bird are Summer Bird, who shares the same sire—Birdstone, and Chocolate Candy, Dunkirk, Flying Private, Brave Victory, Charitable Man, Luv Gov, Miner’s Escape, Mr. Hot Stuff and Nowhere To Hide.

Results

 Margins – 2¾ lengths, Neck
 Time – 2:27.54
 Track – Fast
 All other runners received $4,000 in stakes
 There was an inquiry filed by Charitable Man’s jockey Alan Garcia against Dunkirk for interference, but it was disallowed by the racing stewards

Payout
$2 prices:

 $1 Exacta (4-2): $121.00
 $1 Trifecta (4-2-7): $295.00
 $1 Superfecta (4-2-7-6): $852.00

The Field
The draw for The Belmont Stakes was done on Wednesday, June 3, 2009. Mine That Bird was made the morning line 2-1 favorite and tried to become the 61st favorite to win  and the first since Afleet Alex in 2005.

Performance
 Winner Summer Bird never ran as a 2YO
 First graded stakes victory for winning trainer Tim Ice
 Attendance at Belmont Park dropped 44% from 2008 due to no Triple Crown contender
 Second placed Dunkirk sustained a non-displaced condylar fracture of the left hind cannon bone.

References

External links
 Belmont Homepage

2009
Belmont Stakes
2009 in American sports
2009 in sports in New York (state)